is a town located in Nomi District, Ishikawa Prefecture, Japan. , the town had an estimated population of 6,282 in 1939 households, and a population density of 430 persons per km2.

Geography
Kawakita occupies the northern bank of the Tedori River, sandwiched between the cities of Hakusan to the north and Nomi to the south. It is flatland, subject to flooding. The town has a humid continental climate (Köppen Cfa) characterized by mild summers and cold winters with heavy snowfall.  The average annual temperature in Kawakita is 14.2 °C. The average annual rainfall is 2535 mm with September as the wettest month. The temperatures are highest on average in August, at around 26.7 °C, and lowest in January, at around 2.8 °C.

Neighbouring municipalities
Ishikawa Prefecture
Hakusan
Nomi

Demographics
Per Japanese census data, the population of Kawakita has remained relatively stable apart from an uptick in the 2000s.

History
The area around Kawakita was part of ancient Kaga Province. The area became part of Kaga Domain under the Edo period Tokugawa shogunate.  Following the Meiji restoration, the area was organised into Nomi District, Ishikawa. The villages of Nakajima, Kusabuka, and Sunagawa were founded on April 1, 1889 with the establishment of the modern municipalities system. These three villages merged on Augsu 5, 1907 to form the village of Kawakita. Kawakita was raised to town status on April 1, 1980.

Economy
Agriculture and the manufacture of electrical components is important to the local economy.

Education
Kawakita has three public elementary schools and one public middle school operated by the town government. The town does not have a public high school.

Transportation

Railway
The town does not have any passenger rail service.

Highway

Local attractions
Kawakita Festival

References

External links

 

 
Towns in Ishikawa Prefecture